Trinity Episcopal Cathedral is an Episcopal cathedral in San Jose, California. It is the seat of the Episcopal Diocese of El Camino Real.

History

San Jose was visited by the Right Rev. William Ingraham Kip shortly after he arrived in San Francisco in 1854 as the first Episcopal bishop of the Diocese of California. He conducted the city's first Episcopal service at the Independent Presbyterian Church (later renamed First Presbyterian Church).  He visited San Jose occasionally until the Rev. Sylvester S. Etheridge arrived in late 1860. The following year the congregation organized themselves as Trinity Church.  Services were initially held in the firehouse on North Market Street and then in City Hall.  The present church building was completed in 1863 and was consecrated by Bishop Kip four years later.  Over the years ten Episcopal congregations were formed from Trinity. The Diocese of El Camino Real was created from the Diocese of California in 1980 and Trinity was elevated to a cathedral church.  Trinity Cathedral houses the oldest Episcopal congregation in San Jose, it is the oldest church building in continuous use in the city and is the oldest Episcopal cathedral church in California.

Architecture

The present church was designed by James W. Hammond, who was a retired sea captain and shipbuilder.  He was also a member of Trinity's vestry.  The building was rectangular in shape with a steep hipped roof.  It was constructed of redwood that was logged in the Santa Cruz Mountains.  As the congregation grew it became necessary to expand the building.  Hammond devised a plan by which the church building was cut in half and pulled apart by a team of horses.  The front was shifted to face North Second Street and additional arms were added to create a structure in the form of a cross.  The bell tower was added at the same time.  A spire was added to the tower in 1884.  Renovations in 1958 brought the church to its present appearance.

Hours
The Cathedral is open on Sundays from 8 am to 2 pm.

Rectors and Deans

The rectors of Trinity Cathedral have been:
 Sylvester S. Etheridge (1861-1864)
 Dinsmore D. Chapin (1864-1866)
 Ebenezer S. Peake (1866-1870)
 George W. Foote (1870-1884)
 John B. Wakefield (1884-1899)
 Barr Miller Weeden (1899-1901)
 Charles H. Mockridge (1901-1902)
 George W. Foote (1902-1903) Interim
 J. Wilmer Gresham (1903-1911)
 Halsey Werlein Jr. (1911-1917)
 A. W. Noel Porter (1917-1925)
 Mark Rifenbark (1925-1956)
 William Barton Murdoch (1956-1979)
 David Albert Cooling (1980-1985)
 G. Richard Millard (1985-1988) Interim
 William Power Clancey (1988-1991)
 Philip A. Getchell (1991-1999)
 Ann Winsor (1999-2000)
 Armand H. Kreft (2000)
 James McLeod (Interim)
 Nikolous Merrell (Interim)
 Richard Lief (Interim)
 David Bird (2003-Jan. 2019)

See also

List of the Episcopal cathedrals of the United States
List of cathedrals in the United States

References

External links

Trinity Church, San José, California, Advent 1860 to Easter 1903 at archive.org
Burials from Trinity Church, San Jose, CA, 1860 - 1903 - Chronological Listing

Religious organizations established in 1861
Churches completed in 1863
19th-century Episcopal church buildings
Carpenter Gothic church buildings in California
Episcopal cathedrals in California
1861 establishments in California
Cathedrals in San Jose, California